Cores End is a hamlet in the civil parish of Wooburn (where at the 2011 Census the population was included), in Buckinghamshire, England.

References

Hamlets in Buckinghamshire
Wycombe District